Gorenje Ponikve is a small village in the Municipality of Trebnje in eastern Slovenia. It lies just off the road leading southeast out of Trebnje towards Novo Mesto through Mirna Peč. The area is part of the historical region of Lower Carniola. The municipality is now included in the Southeast Slovenia Statistical Region.

References

External links

Gorenje Ponikve at Geopedia

Populated places in the Municipality of Trebnje